Photometry can refer to:

 Photometry (optics), the science of measurement of visible light in terms of its perceived brightness to human vision
 Photometry (astronomy), the measurement of the flux or intensity of an astronomical object's electromagnetic radiation
 Spectrophotometry, the measurement of spectral distribution along with the flux or intensity
 A photometric study, sometimes also referred to as a lighting "layout" or "point by point"
Photometric stereo, a computer vision technique for estimating 3D shape from one or more images.

See also 
 Photogrammetry
 Radiometry